In mathematics, in particular in algebra, polarization is a technique for expressing a homogeneous polynomial in a simpler fashion by adjoining more variables.  Specifically, given a homogeneous polynomial, polarization produces a unique symmetric multilinear form from which the original polynomial can be recovered by evaluating along a certain diagonal.

Although the technique is deceptively simple, it has applications in many areas of abstract mathematics: in particular to algebraic geometry, invariant theory, and representation theory.  Polarization and related techniques form the foundations for Weyl's invariant theory.

The technique
The fundamental ideas are as follows.  Let  be a polynomial in  variables  Suppose that  is homogeneous of degree  which means that 

Let  be a collection of indeterminates with  so that there are  variables altogether.

Examples

A quadratic example.

More generally, if  is any quadratic form then the polarization of  agrees with the conclusion of the polarization identity.

A cubic example.

Mathematical details and consequences

In particular, it holds over any field of characteristic zero or whose characteristic is strictly greater than

The polarization isomorphism (by degree)

For simplicity, let  be a field of characteristic zero and let  be the polynomial ring in  variables over   Then  is graded by degree, so that

The polarization of algebraic forms then induces an isomorphism of vector spaces in each degree

where  is the -th symmetric power of the -dimensional space  

These isomorphisms can be expressed independently of a basis as follows.

The algebraic isomorphism

Furthermore, the polarization is compatible with the algebraic structure on so that

where  is the full symmetric algebra over

Remarks

 For fields of positive characteristic  the foregoing isomorphisms apply if the graded algebras are truncated at degree 
 There do exist generalizations when  is an infinite dimensional topological vector space.

See also

References
 Claudio Procesi (2007) Lie Groups: an approach through invariants and representations, Springer,  .

Abstract algebra
Homogeneous polynomials